Ganjabad-e Olya, also known as Ganajabad-e Bala, may refer to:
 Ganjabad-e Olya, East Azerbaijan
 Ganjabad-e Olya, Kerman